The Departed is a 2006 American epic crime thriller film directed by Martin Scorsese and written by William Monahan. It is both a remake of the 2002 Hong Kong film Infernal Affairs and also loosely based on the real-life Boston Winter Hill Gang; the character Colin Sullivan is based on the corrupt FBI agent John Connolly, while the character Frank Costello is based on Irish-American gangster Whitey Bulger. The film stars Leonardo DiCaprio, Matt Damon, Jack Nicholson, and Mark Wahlberg, with Martin Sheen, Ray Winstone, Vera Farmiga, Alec Baldwin and James Badge Dale in supporting roles.

The film takes place in Boston. Irish Mob boss Frank Costello (Nicholson) plants Colin Sullivan (Damon) as a spy within the Massachusetts State Police; simultaneously, the police assign undercover state trooper Billy Costigan (DiCaprio) to infiltrate Costello's crew. When both sides realize the situation, Sullivan and Costigan each attempt to discover the other's identity before they are found out.

The Departed was a critical and commercial success, receiving acclaim for its direction, performances (particularly of DiCaprio, Nicholson, and Wahlberg), editing, screenplay, and score, with minor criticism for its plot holes. It won several accolades, including four Oscars at the 79th Academy Awards: for Best Picture, Best Director, Best Adapted Screenplay, and Best Film Editing. It became Scorsese's first and, to date, only personal Oscar win; Wahlberg was also nominated for Best Supporting Actor. The film also received six nominations at the 64th Golden Globe Awards, six nominations at the 60th British Academy Film Awards, and two nominations at the 13th Screen Actors Guild Awards. DiCaprio was nominated for Golden Globe Award for Best Actor – Motion Picture Drama (also nominated that year in the same category for Blood Diamond), BAFTA Award for Best Actor in a Leading Role and Screen Actors Guild Award for Outstanding Performance by a Male Actor in a Supporting Role for his performance.

Plot

In South Boston, Colin Sullivan (Matt Damon) is introduced to Irish Mob boss Frank Costello (Jack Nicholson). Twenty years later, Sullivan has been groomed as a spy inside the Massachusetts State Police (MSP) and joins the Special Investigations Unit, led by Captain Ellerby (Alec Baldwin). Another new officer, Trooper Billy Costigan Jr. (Leonardo DiCaprio), is recruited by Captain Queenan (Martin Sheen) and Staff Sergeant Dignam (Mark Wahlberg) to go undercover and infiltrate Costello's crew.  Ellerby informs Special Investigations that only Queenan and Dignam will know their undercovers' names. Costigan's emotional state declines, but Queenan and Dignam plead with him to keep his cover.

Costigan tells the MSP that Costello's crew is selling stolen computer microprocessors to a Hong Kong Triad. The MSP sets up a sting, but Sullivan tips off Costello, allowing everyone to escape. Costello realizes there is a spy in his crew and tasks Sullivan to find him. Sullivan asks Costello for information on his crew to cross-reference against the MSP database. Meanwhile, Costigan learns that Costello is a protected FBI informant, and Costello accuses Costigan of being the spy, which he denies. Costigan shares his discovery with Queenan and warns him that Costello is aware of a spy in his ranks. Dignam tells him that he believes Costello has his own spy in the MSP. Other than Queenan and Dignam, Costigan's only contact in the MSP is his police-appointed psychiatrist, Madolyn Madden, who is also Sullivan's girlfriend. Costigan and Madolyn later have an affair. 

Costigan follows Costello into a theater and witnesses him giving Sullivan an envelope. Queenan instructs Costigan to get a visual ID of Sullivan but he is unable to get a good look at Sullivan's face. When Sullivan realizes that he is being followed, he mistakenly stabs a restaurant worker and flees. Sullivan tries to cross-reference Costigan's picture, captured by nearby security footage, against police officer databases but cannot identify him. Queenan advises Sullivan to follow Costello to find the MSP mole. Costigan calls Queenan and sets up a meeting but Sullivan has Queenan followed, lying to the other officers that Queenan may be the spy. Sullivan also calls in Costello's gang to the meeting location. 

When Costello's men arrive, Queenan helps Costigan escape before being thrown from the building's roof to his death. Angered by Queenan's murder, Dignam blames and attacks Sullivan and is suspended by Ellerby. One of Costello's wounded henchmen, Timothy Delahunt, tells Costigan that he knows Costigan is the rat, but he succumbs to his injury before he can alert the others. Newspapers report that Delahunt was an undercover officer for the Boston Police but Costello suspects the police department made up the claim so he would stop looking for the mole. Sullivan also learns that Costello is an FBI informant and decides to turn on him. Costello is tailed by the MSP to a cocaine drop-off, where a gunfight erupts, killing most of Costello's crew. Sullivan confronts Costello, who admits to being an FBI informant, and fatally shoots him.

His assignment finished, Costigan goes to Sullivan to reveal his undercover status. He notices Costello's envelope of gang member information on Sullivan's desk and escapes. Sullivan realizes that Costigan knows and erases Costigan's records from police computers. Costigan hands Madolyn an envelope and instructs her to open it if something happens to him. Later, she innocently opens a package Costigan sent to Sullivan and listens to tapes Costello made of himself with Sullivan, causing her to leave Sullivan. Costigan arranges to meet Sullivan on the rooftop where Queenan was killed, then arrests him. Costigan calls Trooper Brown, a friend from the police academy, to substantiate his identity, but Brown pulls a gun on Costigan when he arrives, unsure who is telling the truth. 

Costigan says that he has evidence tying Sullivan to Costello, and Brown lets him go down the elevator. Upon reaching the lobby, Costigan and Brown are killed by Trooper Barrigan, a friend of Sullivan's who reveals himself to be another spy working for Costello. Sullivan shoots Barrigan dead, allowing him to out Barrigan as the mole while removing suspicion from himself. When Sullivan arrives home after attending Costigan's funeral, Dignam is waiting for him. Sullivan accepts his fate and Dignam shoots him in the head.

Cast

Production

In January 2003, Warner Bros., producer Brad Grey, and actor/producer Brad Pitt bought the rights to remake the Hong Kong film Infernal Affairs (2002) from Media Asia for $1.75 million. William Monahan was secured as a screenwriter, and later Martin Scorsese, who admired Monahan's script, came on board as director.

In March 2004, United Press International announced that Scorsese would be remaking Infernal Affairs and setting it in Boston, and that Leonardo DiCaprio and Brad Pitt were slated to star. Pitt, tentatively scheduled to play Sullivan, later declined to play the role, saying a younger actor should play the part; he decided to produce the film instead. Scorsese's associate Kenneth Lonergan suggested Matt Damon, who grew up in Boston, for the part of Sullivan, and Scorsese asked Jack Nicholson to play Costello. Robert De Niro was approached to play Queenan, but De Niro declined to direct The Good Shepherd.

Nicholson wanted the film to have "something a little more" than the usual gangster film, and screenwriter Monahan came up with the idea of basing the Costello character on Irish-American gangster Whitey Bulger. This gave the screenplay an element of realism—and an element of dangerous uncertainty, because of the wide-ranging carte blanche the FBI gave Bulger in exchange for revealing information about fellow gangsters. A technical consultant on the film was Tom Duffy, who had served three decades on the Boston Police Department, particularly as an undercover detective investigating the Irish mob.

The Departed was officially greenlit by Warner Bros. in early 2005 and began shooting in the spring of 2005. Some of the film was shot on location in Boston. For budgetary and logistical reasons many scenes, in particular interiors, were shot in locations and sets in New York City, which had tax incentives for filmmakers that Boston at the time did not.

Analysis
Film critic Stanley Kauffmann said that for The Departed, Scorsese "was apparently concerned with the idea of identity, one of the ancient themes of drama, and how it affects one's actions, emotions, self-knowledge, even dreams." Kauffmann, however, did not find the theme conveyed with particular effectiveness in the film. Film critic Roger Ebert compared Costigan and Sullivan's seeking of approval from those they are deceiving to Stockholm syndrome. Ebert also noted the themes of Catholic guilt.

In the final scene, a rat is seen on Sullivan's window ledge. Scorsese acknowledges that while it is not meant to be taken literally, it somewhat symbolizes the "quest for the rat" in the film and the strong sense of distrust among the characters, much like post-9/11 U.S. The window view behind the rat is a nod to gangster films like Little Caesar (1931), Scarface (1932), and White Heat (1949).

Throughout the film, Scorsese uses an "X" motif to foreshadow death in a manner similar to Howard Hawks' film Scarface (1932). Examples include shots of cross-beam supports in an airport walkway when Costigan is phoning Sgt. Dignam, the lighted "X" on the wall in Sullivan's office when he assures Costello over the phone that Costigan is not the rat, the taped windows of the building Queenan enters before being thrown to his death, behind Costigan's head in the elevator before he is shot, and the carpeted hallway floor when Sullivan returns to his apartment before being shot by Dignam at the film's end.

Jim Emerson, writing for RogerEbert.com, noted that Nicholson's character, and possibly Damon's, may be read as latently homosexual. He also notes that the inspiration for Nicholson's character, Bulger, was reportedly bisexual.

Release
The Departed grossed $132.4 million in the United States and Canada and $159 million in other territories for a total gross of $291.5 million, against a production budget of $90 million.

The film grossed $26.9 million in its opening weekend, becoming the fourth Scorsese film to debut at number one. In the following three weeks the film grossed $19 million, $13.5 million and $9.8 million, finishing second at the box office each time, before grossing $7.7 million and dropping to 5th in its fifth week.

Reception
On review aggregator Rotten Tomatoes, the film holds a 91% approval rating based on 284 reviews, with an average rating of 8.3/10. The website's critics consensus reads, "Featuring outstanding work from an excellent cast, The Departed is a thoroughly engrossing gangster drama with the gritty authenticity and soupy morality we have come to expect from Martin Scorsese." Metacritic, which uses a weighted average, assigned the film a score of 85 out of 100 based on 39 critics, indicating "universal acclaim". Audiences polled by CinemaScore gave the film an average grade of "A−" on an A+ to F scale.

Entertainment Weekly ranked it on its end-of-the-decade "Best of" list, saying: "If they're lucky, directors make one classic film in their career. Martin Scorsese has one per decade (Taxi Driver in the '70s, Raging Bull in the '80s, Goodfellas in the '90s). His 2006 Irish Mafia masterpiece kept the streak alive."

Roger Ebert gave the film four stars out of four, praising Scorsese for thematically differentiating his film from the original. Online critic James Berardinelli awarded the film four stars out of four, praising it as "an American epic tragedy." He went on to claim that the film deserves to be ranked alongside Scorsese's past successes, including Taxi Driver, Raging Bull and Goodfellas.

Andrew Lau, the co-director of Infernal Affairs, who was interviewed by Hong Kong newspaper Apple Daily, said: "Of course I think the version I made is better, but the Hollywood version is pretty good too. [Scorsese] made the Hollywood version more attuned to American culture." Andy Lau, one of the main actors in Infernal Affairs, when asked how the movie compares to the original, said: "The Departed was too long and it felt as if Hollywood had combined all three Infernal Affairs movies together."

Although Lau said the script of the remake had some "golden quotes", he also felt it had a bit too much profanity. He ultimately rated The Departed eight out of ten and said that the Hollywood remake is worth a view, though according to Lau's spokeswoman Alice Tam, he felt that the combination of the two female characters into one in The Departed was not as good as the original storyline.

A few critics were disappointed in the film, including J. Hoberman of the Village Voice, who wrote: "Infernal Affairs was surprisingly cool and effectively restrained for HK action, but Scorsese raises the temperature with every ultraviolent interaction. The surplus of belligerence and slur reach near-Tarantinian levels—appropriate as he's staking a claim to QT's turf."

Top ten lists
The film appeared on many critics' top ten lists of the best films of 2006. Carrie Rickey of The Philadelphia Inquirer, Joe Morgenstern of The Wall Street Journal, Ruthe Stein of the San Francisco Chronicle, and Steven Rea of The Philadelphia Inquirer named it one of the top ten films of 2006. Richard Roeper of the Chicago Sun-Times named it the best film of the 2000s.

 1st – Richard Roeper, Ebert and Roeper
 1st – Peter Travers, Rolling Stone
 1st – Rene Rodriguez, The Miami Herald
 1st – Scott Tobias, The A.V. Club
 1st – Joshua Rothkopf, Time Out New York
 1st – Philip Martin, Arkansas Democrat-Gazette
 1st – James Berardinelli, ReelViews
 2nd – Chris Kaltenbach, The Baltimore Sun
 2nd – Adam Kempenaar, Filmspotting
 2nd – Keith Phipps, The A.V. Club
 2nd – Kyle Smith, New York Post
 2nd – Mike Russell, The Oregonian
 2nd – Richard James Havis, The Hollywood Reporter
 2nd – Richard Schickel, TIME
 3rd – Frank Scheck, The Hollywood Reporter
 4th – Glenn Kenny, Premiere
 4th – Marc Savlov, The Austin Chronicle
 4th – Michael Wilmington, Chicago Tribune

 4th – Roger Ebert, Chicago Sun-Times
 5th – Empire
 5th – David Ansen, Newsweek
 5th – Kevin Crust, Los Angeles Times
 5th – Lisa Schwarzbaum, Entertainment Weekly
 5th – Stephen Hunter, The Washington Post
 6th – Ann Hornaday, The Washington Post
 6th – Jack Mathews, Daily News
 6th – Nathan Rabin, The A.V. Club
 6th – Ty Burr, The Boston Globe
 7th – Nathan Lee, The Village Voice
 7th – Noel Murray, The A.V. Club
 7th – Peter Hartlaub, San Francisco Chronicle
 8th – Michael Sragow, The Baltimore Sun
 9th – Claudia Puig, USA Today
 9th – Desson Thomson, The Washington Post
 9th – Lou Lumenick, New York Post
 9th – Michael Rechtshaffen, The Hollywood Reporter

Accolades

At the 64th Golden Globe Awards on January 15, 2007, The Departed won one award for Best Director (Martin Scorsese), while being nominated for five other awards including Best Picture, Best Actor (Leonardo DiCaprio), Best Supporting Actor (Jack Nicholson, Mark Wahlberg), and Best Screenplay (William Monahan).

At the 79th Academy Awards on February 25, 2007, The Departed won four Academy Awards: Best Picture (Graham King), Best Director (Martin Scorsese), Best Film Editing (Thelma Schoonmaker), and Best Adapted Screenplay Writing (William Monahan). Mark Wahlberg was also nominated for the Best Supporting Actor award for his performance, but he lost to Alan Arkin for his role in Little Miss Sunshine.

The film marked the first time Scorsese won an Oscar after five previous losses. Many felt that he deserved it years earlier for prior efforts. Some felt he deserved it for his prior nominations and the win was described as a "Lifetime Achievement Award for a lesser film". Scorsese himself joked that he won because: "This is the first movie I've done with a plot."

At the 11th Satellite Awards on December 18, 2006, The Departed won awards for Best Ensemble, Motion Picture, Best Motion Picture, Drama, Best Screenplay – Adapted (William Monahan), and Best Actor in a Supporting Role (Leonardo DiCaprio). In 2008, it was nominated for the American Film Institute Top 10 Gangster Films list

Home media
The Departed was released by Warner Home Video on DVD in 2007. The film is available in a single-disc full screen (1.33:1), single-disc widescreen (2.40:1) edition, and 2-disc special edition. The second disc contains deleted scenes; a feature about the influence of New York's Little Italy on Scorsese; a Turner Classic Movies profile; and a 21-minute documentary titled Stranger Than Fiction: The True Story of Whitey Bulger, Southie and The Departed about the crimes that influenced Scorsese in creating the film, including the story of James "Whitey" Bulger, upon whom Jack Nicholson's character is based.

Music

Soundtrack

Score
The film score for The Departed was written by Howard Shore and performed by guitarists Sharon Isbin, G. E. Smith, Larry Saltzman and Marc Ribot. The score was recorded in Shore's own studio in New York State. The album, The Departed: Original Score, was released December 5, 2006 by New Line, and produced by Jason Cienkus.

Scorsese described the music as "a very dangerous and lethal tango" and cited the guitar-based score of Murder by Contract and the zither in The Third Man as inspiration.

Cancelled sequel
Although many of the key characters in the film are dead by the end, there was a script written for a sequel. This was ultimately shelved due to the expense and Scorsese's lack of interest in creating a sequel.

See also
 List of American films of 2006
 "The Debarted", an episode of The Simpsons that parodies the film.
 List of films that most frequently use the word fuck

Notes

Further reading

External links

 
 
 
 
 
 
 

2006 films
2006 crime drama films
2006 crime thriller films
2000s American films
2000s English-language films
American crime drama films
American crime thriller films
American neo-noir films
American police detective films
American remakes of Hong Kong films
American thriller drama films
Best Picture Academy Award winners
Culture of Boston
Edgar Award-winning works
Fictional portrayals of the Boston Police Department
Films about Irish-American culture
Films about the Irish Mob
Films directed by Martin Scorsese
Films produced by Brad Grey
Films produced by Brad Pitt
Films produced by Graham King
Films scored by Howard Shore
Films set in 1986
Films set in 2006
Films set in 2007
Films set in a movie theatre
Films set in Boston
Films shot in Boston
Films shot in Massachusetts
Films shot in New York City
Films whose director won the Best Directing Academy Award
Films whose director won the Best Director Golden Globe
Films whose editor won the Best Film Editing Academy Award
Films whose writer won the Best Adapted Screenplay Academy Award
Films with screenplays by William Monahan
Initial Entertainment Group films
Media Asia films
Plan B Entertainment films
Vertigo Entertainment films
Warner Bros. films